Al Arabiya English is the English language service of the Dubai-based regional Arab newscaster, Al-Arabiya News Channel. Its main audiences reside in the United States and the United Kingdom.

Foundation and early days

Al-Arabiya English began in 2007 along with Persian and Urdu. It carried wire news and selected translated articles from Al Arabiya's main Arabic language news site at first.

A number of editors were brought in to manage the service independently, including American journalist Courtney Radsch who linked her redundancy to a news piece she ran regarding fatigue levels among pilots and crew of Emirates Airlines. Other editors have included Pranay Gupte, who served between 2011 - 2012 and Faisal J. Abbas, who served as editor between 2012 - 2016 and was most renowned for relaunching and growing the page into a fully integrated news service providing original and exclusive reporting, as well as translated material from the main Al Arabiya channel and enhancing its presence on social media.

Saudi columnist Mamdouh Almuhaini was appointed as general manager of Al Arabiya Network in October 2019. Before that, he was appointed on 27 September 2017 as the editor-in-chief of all of Al Arabiya's digital platforms, which include the English, Arabic, Urdu and Persian websites. He is renowned for managing the coverage of the Donald Trump election, the Qatar diplomatic crisis as well as many other various projects.

Relaunch
On 1 July 2012, Al Arabiya News Channel issued a statement announcing the appointment of Faisal J. Abbas, a Huffington Post blogger, Middle East correspondent and former media editor of London-based daily Asharq Al Awsat, as editor-in-chief of its English Service. Commenting on the appointment, Abdul Rahman al-Rashed, then General Manager of the channel said: “Faisal is among the most distinguished young journalists and it is a pleasure to have him on-board to continue taking the website forward.”  In November 2013, the site was re-launched.

Criticism
In 2012, Al Arabiya English published a series of stories which were based on revealing leaked emails belonging to Sherri Jaafari, the daughter of Syria's UN envoy Bashar Jaafari. The leaked emails showed Sherri requesting an internship with US television host Charlie Rose in exchange for securing an interview with President Assad. Furthermore, the emails revealed how Sherri worked with NY-based public relations company BLJ to produce a 2011 Vogue magazine feature about Asma al-Assad, the Syrian leader's wife, which labelled her a "rose in the desert" while Syria was undergoing a civil war. Al Arabiya English's stories were carried by a number of US media outlets, including the New York Post and The Huffington Post. In response, Syria's UN envoy urged the media to leave his family alone

Following an Op-Ed published on 5 March 2015, calling for President Barack Obama to "listen to (Israeli PM) Netanyahu" when it comes to the threat imposed by the Iranian nuclear deal, many Arab, Iranian and even Western media outlets criticized Al Arabiya English's editorial stance. Based on this op-ed, the London Independent journalist Robert Fisk wrote on 6 March that the column, which was written by Al Arabiya English's editor-in-chief at the time, would not have been published unless it was blessed by the Saudi monarchy.

References

External links 

 

Al Arabiya
Conspiracist media
Middle East Broadcasting Center
Emirati news websites
Saudi Arabian news websites
Internet properties established in 2007
Multilingual news services
State media